Disney's Print Studio is a series of crafts/design IBM PC compatible video games released by Disney Interactive, which allows players to print various types of documents in the themes of its licensed property. The 1994 Aladdin game was the precursor to the Print Studio games to follow, and set in motion the template of how those games would work.

List of games

Reception

References

Video game franchises
Disney Interactive
Disney Interactive franchises
Disney video games
Video games based on films
Children's educational video games